Admiral Franklin may refer to:

John Franklin (1786–1847), British Royal Navy rear admiral
Samuel Rhoads Franklin (1825–1909), U.S. Navy rear admiral

See also
Peter Franklyn (born 1946), British Royal Navy rear admiral